The 1992–93 Belgian Hockey League season was the 73rd season of the Belgian Hockey League, the top level of ice hockey in Belgium. Six teams participated in the league, and Herentals IJC won the championship.

Regular season
 
 (* IHC Leuven had two points deducted.)

Playoffs

References
Season on hockeyarchives.info

Belgian Hockey League
Belgian Hockey League seasons
Bel